Padaorg Landscape Conservation Area() is a nature park in Lääne-Viru County, Estonia.

The area of the nature park is 178 ha.

The protected area was founded in 1978 to protect Pada Valley and its surrounding areas. In 2005, the protected area was designated to the landscape conservation area.

References

Nature reserves in Estonia
Geography of Lääne-Viru County